Petrophila insulalis is a moth in the family Crambidae. It was described by Francis Walker in 1862. It is found on Haiti.

References

Petrophila
Moths described in 1862